Oak Hammock Marsh is a marsh and a wildlife management area located  north of Winnipeg, Manitoba, Canada. The WMA is considered to be a Class IV protected area under the IUCN protected area management categories. The marsh is recognized as an Important Bird Area (IBA) for its globally significant numbers of waterfowl and shorebirds. It is a designated Ramsar site due to its international importance as a breeding and staging area for waterfowl and other migratory birds.

History

The marsh is a remnant of an originally 470 sq km area of marsh and fen near the south-western corner of Lake Winnipeg. This larger marsh had the original English name of St. Andrews Bog. But the original wetland underwent drainage for agricultural purposes beginning in 1897, and by the early 1960s all but 60 ha had been drained. Measures to restore a portion of the wetland began in 1967 when the Governments of Manitoba and Canada embarked on a cooperative program with Ducks Unlimited Canada and other wildlife conservation organizations to restore marginal agricultural lands to a state suitable for wildlife.

By 1974, 3,450 ha of land had been purchased and 22 km of dykes built to trap and hold water in three dyke-separated marsh compartments. In addition, 58 nesting islands were constructed within the three compartments. In 1984, the Manitoba government signed a further development agreement with Ducks Unlimited Canada to construct water control structures, water supply works, more nesting islands, additional dykes, and create a fourth compartment.

Geography
It is located near the town of Stonewall, Manitoba in the Rural Municipality of Rockwood.

The marsh is a re-constructed and managed wetland, designed for the creation of a waterfowl breeding and migratory habitat. Water levels in the marsh are carefully controlled. It is common during wet years (when waterfowl have an abundance of alternative nesting sites) for the water level in one or more of the compartments to be lowered for the summer, creating an extensive area of dried mudflats. This drying and later reflooding promotes the growth of emergent marsh plants such as bulrush and cattail, and therefore maintains the vegetation cover of the marsh; otherwise, the natural tendency would be for the marsh to become over several years simply a shallow lake, with a sharply defined shoreline and little nesting cover. Furthermore, not all of the adjacent purchased land has been allowed to grow wild. Cereal grain crops are planted in some of it, in order to supply migrating waterfowl with an autumn food supply while reducing crop losses on local farms.

Critics contend that the marsh is simply a "duck factory" for the benefit of hunters.  Supporters believe that it would be unrealistic to expect that the required funds to recreate the marsh would have been forthcoming if wild ducks had no economic and recreational value to sportsmen. Oak Hammock Marsh, like other prairie wetlands, supports many wildlife species besides game birds.

The marsh itself is closed to hunting, but game birds (primarily mallards, snow geese, and Canada geese) are hunted in the autumn when they leave the marsh to feed in the surrounding grain fields. The waterfowl is additionally protected by a buffer zone extending 1 km from the water inside which hunting is prohibited, this protection extending outside of the WMA in some locations.

The western shore of the marsh is home to Ducks Unlimited Canada's national head office, in a building that also serves as a public Interpretive Centre for the marsh. Boardwalks from the Interpretive Centre allow public access to the marsh and dykes. The building of a head office and public facility so close to critical wildlife habitat was the cause of controversy in the 1980s.

Ecology

Spring and fall migration
More than 280 species of birds have been reported from the area, many of them during the spring and fall migrations. Numbers of staging waterfowl peak in early October when more than 300,000 ducks and geese may be present. Other species gathering in large numbers in the fall include Yellow-headed blackbird, Red-winged blackbird, and Bank swallow.

The area is an important migration support for several shorebird species—White-rumped sandpiper, Short-billed dowitcher, Hudsonian godwit— as well as Sandhill crane, American white pelican, and Tundra swan.

Snowy owl, Short-eared owl, Bald eagle, and Northern harrier can be seen in the fall and into winter.

Breeding birds
More than 90 species of birds are known to have bred at Oak Hammock Marsh. Colonial nesters represented by significant numbers include Franklin's gull, Black tern, Forster's tern, Black-crowned night heron, and Herring gull. Upland nesters include Blue-winged teal, Northern shoveler and Northern pintail. Nesting islands and wetland edges are utilized by Mallard, Gadwall, Canvasback, Redhead, Lesser scaup, Ruddy duck, Western grebe and Eared grebe.

Plants
Cattails, bulrushes and common reed are frequent in the flooded impoundments. Willow clumps grow in drier areas. Some areas that were previously under cultivation are planted with nesting cover, while lure crops are grown in others. The Brennan Prairie is found on the west side of the WMA.  In the southeastern corner, a second tall grass prairie remnant abuts an area of aspen-oak forest. 

More than 100 species are found in the area,  including big bluestem, little bluestem, switchgrass, prairie cord grass, needle and thread grass, prairie lily, golden Alexanders, and blazingstar.

See Also
List of wildlife management areas in Manitoba
List of protected areas of Manitoba

References

External links

 Harry J. Enns Wetland Discovery Centre
 Oak Hammock Marsh on iNaturalist
 Oak Hammock Marsh on eBird 

Lakes of Manitoba
Marshes of Canada
Ramsar sites in Canada
Important Bird Areas of Manitoba
Stonewall, Manitoba
Nature centres in Manitoba
Protected areas of Manitoba
Wildlife management areas of Manitoba